Qasemabad (also Romanized as Qāsemābād; also known as Qāsemābād-e Dīneh Rāk and Qāsemīābād) is a village in Qaleh-ye Khvajeh Rural District, in the Central District of Andika County, Khuzestan Province, Iran. At the 2006 census, its population was 305, in 62 families.

References 

Populated places in Andika County